Donald Kofi Tucker (March 18, 1938 – October 17, 2005) was an American politician who served in the New Jersey General Assembly from 1998 until his death in 2005, representing the 29th district and later the 28th. He was also a member of the Municipal Council of Newark, serving from 1974 until his death.

Tucker received a B.A. degree from Goddard College in Urban Planning. He served in the United States Air Force from 1955 to 1959 as an Airman Second Class.

Tucker served as a Councilman-at-Large in Newark and served on the Newark Municipal Council from 1974 and on the Passaic Valley Sewerage Commission from 1985.

Tucker was a member of the Essex County chapter of the Congress of Racial Equality and was involved in efforts to desegregate Newark's public housing projects. He founded a tenants council and served as chairman of the New Jersey Black Issues Convention.

He was the Assembly's Speaker Pro Tempore from 2002 until his death. Tucker served on the Assembly's Commerce and Economic Development Committee (as Chair) and on the Joint Committee on the Public Schools.

Despite his failing health — he suffered from diabetes, survived a stroke, and had a pacemaker implanted — he remained in his seat in the Assembly and on the Newark City Council (where he served for 31 continuous years) until his death in 2005. In 2008, his widow, Cleopatra Tucker, was elected to the Assembly to represent the 28th district.

References

External links
Assemblyman Tucker's Legislative Website
New Jersey Voter Information Website 2003
Obituary from Newark Star-Ledger

1938 births
2005 deaths
African-American state legislators in New Jersey
Democratic Party members of the New Jersey General Assembly
New Jersey city council members
Politicians from Newark, New Jersey
Goddard College alumni
United States Air Force airmen
20th-century American politicians
21st-century American politicians
20th-century African-American politicians
21st-century African-American politicians